The Canadian Anti-Hate Network (CAHN) is a Canadian nonprofit organization that monitors hate groups, far-right groups, and hate crimes in Canada. It was formed in 2018 in Toronto, Ontario and receives funding from the Government of Canada. CAHN provides information to journalists and the media, researchers, law enforcement, policy makers, and community organizations. The organization is modelled after and supported by the American Southern Poverty Law Center (SPLC).

History 
CAHN was formed in 2018 in Toronto, Ontario by more than fifteen journalists, community leaders, academics, and legal experts. In its first public statement in 2018, CAHN called for criminal charges to be brought against Montreal IT consultant and Neo-Nazi Gabriel Sohier Chaput, who goes by the pseudonym Charles Zeiger.

In 2019, white nationalist Kevin Goudreau was served with a peace bond obliging his to stay away from CAHN staff, after he encourage violence towards staff. 

On November 1, 2020, Chris Vanderweide, known as 'Helmet Guy' for participating in violence at Hamilton Pride 2019, was arrested by the York Regional Police (YRP) and charged with uttering threats against CAHN chair Bernie Farber and CAHN executive director Evan Balgord in a private Facebook group. Before contacting the YRP, CAHN had contacted the Hamilton Police Service (HPS) about the threats, but HPS declined to investigate the threats due to their wording. Afterwards, Farber called for an internal investigation into the HPS and for Hamilton Mayor Fred Eisenberger to look into why the threats were not further investigated. In response, Constable Jerome Stewart said that "The matter is before the court system in York Region and as such Hamilton Police will not provide any further comments at this time".

In the aftermath of the 2021 United States Capitol Attack, a team from CAHN was attempting to identify three people seen at the riot, one of whom was holding a Canadian flag.

On April 15, 2021, CAHN filed a complaint with the Law Society of Ontario against criminal lawyer Colin A. Browne for reciting the oath of the far-right Proud Boys organization in a video posted on Telegram.

In a September 9, 2021 CTV News interview, CAHN deputy director Elizabeth Simons described people "at the heart of" COVID-19 protests in Canada, including "anti-lockdown, anti-mask and anti-vaccine protests", as part of a "far-right", "anti-democratic", and "pro-insurrectionist" movement who hold extreme views on a number of issues.

In February 2022, CAHN chair Bernie Farber posted a photo to Twitter claiming to have an anti-semitic pamphlet that was allegedly being handed out during the Freedom Convoy. The photo was proved to be a hoax by Quillette associate editor Jonathan Kay. The pamphlet originated in a Twitter post two weeks earlier from someone in Miami, Florida.

In late June 2022, the CAHN published an online booklet with the goal of educating teachers, students, and parents on how to identify and confront forms of hate in school and online.

In October 2022, the Government of Saskatchewan said that it would discourage teachers from using an anti-hate toolkit created by the CAHN, adding that "The toolkit does not meet criteria such as being high quality, free from bias as reasonably possible, and having appropriate and significant Saskatchewan context".

In 2019, human rights lawyer and CAHN Board Member Richard Warman, sued Jonathan Kay and Barbara Kay in Small Claims Court for libel in response to the two journalists linking CAHN to "violent ANTIFA". In a judgement released on November 10, 2022 the claim was dismissed. In its reasoning the judge noted that based on "the evidence disclosed...CAHN did in fact assist Antifa and that the movement has been violent." The judge went on to condemn Warman noting that "he has used litigation to silence or intimidate those he sees as his critics, or who oppose his methods of prosecuting hate groups." 

In 2022, the Liberal government has cut funding for an anti-racism group and suspended work on a project it was running after a member of the group made antisemitic remarks in a social media post.

"Antisemitism has no place in this country. The antisemitic comments made by Laith Marouf are reprehensible and vile," Housing and Diversity and Inclusion Minister Ahmed Hussen said in a statement posted on Twitter Monday. 

"We have provided notice to the Community Media Advocacy Centre (CMAC) that their funding has been cut and their project has been suspended."

Marouf, a senior consultant on an anti-racism project that received $133,000 from the federal government, posted the controversial remarks on his Twitter account. The account is private but a screenshot of the post showed a number of tweets with his photo and name. 

One tweet said: "You know all those loud mouthed bags of human feces, aka the Jewish White Supremacists; when we liberate Palestine and they have to go back to where they come from, they will return to being low voiced bitches of [their] Christian/Secular White Supremacist Masters."

References

External links 

 Official website

Organizations established in 2018
Anti-fascist organizations
Anti-racist organizations in Canada
2018 establishments in Ontario
Southern Poverty Law Center